Theodore Bruce Bawer (born October 31, 1956) is an American writer who has been a resident of Norway since 1999. He is a literary, film, and cultural critic and a novelist and poet, who has also written about gay rights, Christianity, and Islam.

Bawer's writings on literature, gay issues and Islam have been seen as both controversial and affirming. While championing such authors as William Keepers Maxwell Jr., Flannery O'Connor, and Guy Davenport, he has criticized such authors as Norman Mailer and E. L. Doctorow. A member of the New Formalists, a group of poets who promoted the use of traditional forms, he has assailed such poets as Allen Ginsberg for what he views as their lack of polish and technique.

Bawer was one of the first gay activists to seriously propose same-sex marriage, especially in his book A Place at the Table (1993). While Europe Slept (2006) was one of the first to skeptically examine the rise of Islam(ism) and Sharia in the Western world, and The Victims' Revolution (2012) was an early criticism of academic identity studies.

Although he has been described as a conservative, by some, Bawer has often argued that such labels are misleading or reductionist. He has explained his views as follows: "Read A Place at the Table and Stealing Jesus and While Europe Slept and Surrender one after the other and you will see that all four books are motivated by a dedication to individual identity and individual freedom and an opposition to groupthink, oppression, tyranny."

Early life and education
Bawer is of Polish descent through his father and is of English, Welsh, Scottish, Scotch-Irish, and French descent through his mother, whom he profiled in the September 2017 issue of Commentary.

Born and raised in New York City, Bawer attended New York City public schools and Stony Brook University, where he studied literature under the poet Louis Simpson, among others. As a graduate student, he taught undergraduate courses in literature and composition. He earned a B.A. in English from Stony Brook in 1978, followed by an M.A. in 1982 and a Ph.D. in 1983, both also in English. While in graduate school, he published essays in such academic journals as Notes on Modern American Literature and the Wallace Stevens Journal, and opinion pieces in Newsweek, the Los Angeles Times, and elsewhere. His dissertation, "The Middle Generation", was about the poets Delmore Schwartz, Randall Jarrell, John Berryman, and Robert Lowell.

Writing career

Literary criticism

A revised version of Bawer's dissertation was published under the same title in 1986. Reviewing the book in The New Criterion, James Atlas called the "character analyses... shrewdly intuitive and sympathetic", found Bawer's "explanation for why the poets of the Middle Generation were so obsessed with [T.S.] Eliot especially persuasive", and described Bawer as "an impressive textual critic" with a "casual and self-assured" critical voice.

Bawer contributed to the arts journal The New Criterion between October 1983 and May 1993. A New York Times Magazine article "The Changing World of New York Intellectuals", foregrounded the contributors to The New Criterion, observing that "The youthful contributors to Hilton Kramer's magazine—Bruce Bawer, Mimi Kramer, Roger Kimball—are still in their 20s, but they manage to sound like the British critic F.R. Leavis. Their articles are full of pronouncements about 'moral values,' 'the crisis in the humanities,' 'the significance of art.' Their mission is to defend American culture against shoddy merchandise, and they don't shirk from the task."

Early books

In 1987, his book The Contemporary Stylist was published by Harcourt Brace Jovanovich. The year after, Graywolf Press issued Diminishing Fictions, a collection of essays on the modern novel. Reviewing it in the Chicago Tribune, Jack Fuller complained of "sour notes", such as "undeserved sneers", but concluded that "What redeems Bawer's excesses is the persuasive case he makes that he is on a desperate rescue mission."

Graywolf published Bawer's second collection of essays on fiction, The Aspect of Eternity, in 1993. Publishers Weekly called the essays "beautifully written" and "a cause for celebration", and George Core, in The Washington Times, called Bawer "a first-rate critic whose continuing achievement as an independent literary journalist... is cause for our astonishment and celebration—one of the few positive signs about critics and criticism in our contentious and stuffy times".

Bawer also published a collection of essays on poetry, Prophets and Professors, in 1995. "Running through these critical commentaries", wrote Publishers Weekly, "is the theme that too many younger poets are caught up in romantic excess, that the influence of Allen Ginsberg and the Beats and the confessional self-destruction of Sylvia Plath have excused so much of the sloppy, informal and poured-out emotion of today's poets... He is on the side of the formalists and those for whom poetry is not a game of literary gossip. This book is an intelligent study by someone who has read and judged a great deal of poetry and criticism."

In The New York Times, Katherine Knorr wrote that "Bawer is one of the best literary critics in America today", who proves "that the best literary criticism comes from a serious, close reading of the work that avoids the temptations of celebrity and fashionable politics".

Reviewing Prophets and Professors, Washington Post critic Jonathan Yardley described Bawer as "one of the appallingly few American literary journalists whose work repays the reading" and "an intelligent, independent, tough-minded critic and a clear-eyed observer of literary affairs". In The New York Times Book Review, Andrea Barnet described the book as "immensely readable... provocative and entertaining", saying that Bawer was "thoughtful, sharply opinionated, high-minded and unafraid to slash at sacred cows", Leslie Schenk of World Literature Today opined that Bawer "has the uncanny knack of writing good sense precisely in those fields where good sense seems to have been taboo... As though with the scalpel of a surgeon removing tumors, he deftly, coolly, cuts through the ephemeral malarkey that hitherto obscured his subjects. His book A Place at the Table, for example, stands as solid as the Rock of Gibraltar in the seas of mush that otherwise surround the subject of homosexuality." In Prophets and Professors, "Bawer performs a similar operation on American academia's pet fetish, modern poetry", resulting in "the most important book on poetry since Dana Gioia's Can Poetry Matter?"

Poetry

Along with Dana Gioia, Thomas M. Disch, Charles Martin, and others, Bawer was one of the leading figures of the New Formalism movement in poetry. His poetry appeared in the 1996 anthology Rebel Angels: 25 Poets of the New Formalism, and he contributed to an essay (described as "heavy-handed" by Publishers Weekly) to the movement's manifesto, Poetry after Modernism.

Bawer's poems have appeared in Poetry, Paris Review, and The New Criterion. A chapbook of Bawer's poems, Innocence, was published in 1988 by Aralia Press, which also published individual poems by Bawer in other forms. A full-length collection of Bawer's poetry, Coast to Coast, appeared in 1993. It was selected as the year's best first book of poetry by the Dictionary of Literary Biography Yearbook.

Film criticism

From 1987 to 1990, Bawer served as the film critic for the conservative monthly The American Spectator.  He also wrote several articles on film for The New York Times and other publications. A collection of his film reviews, The Screenplay's the Thing,  was published in 1992. "Best known as a literary critic, Bawer is an engaging, astute, formidable film reviewer as well", wrote Publishers Weekly,  describing Bawer as a "[p]olitically unpredictable" critic who "deflates the arty (Caravaggio), the preachy (Platoon; The Milagro Beanfield War) and the kitschy (The Unbearable Lightness of Being), but gives thumbs up to The World According to Garp, Raising Arizona, Roxanne, Crossing Delancey and The Mosquito Coast... One wishes he were a full-time movie critic." Bawer later wrote that he left The American Spectator because of a conflict with an editor over a reference to homosexuality in one of his reviews. He has since returned to the magazine as a freelance book reviewer.

Gay rights

A Place at the Table

Bawer's book A Place at the Table: The Gay Individual in American Society (1993) was published by Simon & Schuster. He described it in its first pages as "a reflection on the theme of homosexuality", motivated by the fact that current debates had "generated a lot more heat than light". The book, which criticized both heterosexuals' antigay prejudices and the political and cultural stereotypes which, in his view, were foisted on many gay people by the "queer subculture", received much attention. Reviews in mainstream media tended to be positive, while, as Bawer himself later put it, "antigay conservatives and queer lefties alike savaged the book"

Author and attorney Dale Carpenter later summed up the response of many gay publications: "In a year-end roundup of gay-themed books for 1993, one critic for San Francisco's Bay Area Reporter called the book 'terrible,' but nevertheless 'important' because of its widespread impact. Gay professor and author David Bergman chided Bawer for allegedly failing to appreciate 'the great spectacle of human difference,' but acknowledged that Bawer had expressed 'what many people feel.'"

Among the book's admirers were James P. Pinkerton, who, writing in Newsday, praised Bawer's "live and let live" message.  Describing the book as "a conservative manifesto declaring what the silent majority of gays wants and why", John Fink of the Chicago Tribune wrote: "If there is one book about homosexuality and gay rights that everyone should read, it is probably this one." In Reason, David Link wrote that "Bawer is not a champion of any cause except good sense... A Place at the Table is ultimately a defense of self-determination, and a much-needed one." Lee Dembart described it in the Los Angeles Times as "a remarkable, gutsy, even brilliant book" and "the most interesting, provocative and original discussion of gay themes that I can recall".

Christopher Lehmann-Haupt gave the book a mixed review, describing it as "eloquent", "intelligent", and "eye-opening", but accusing Bawer of "sometimes twisting the logic of those he disagrees with", "relying too heavily on his own dogma", and "failing to come to grips with some fundamental issues". Still, he wrote, the book "smashes the common stereotypes of gay people to smithereens". In The Washington Post, Jonathan Yardley, too, found the book "imperfect", accusing Bawer of a "regrettable penchant for sweeping generalizations", "a surprisingly rancorous view of conventional heterosexual marriage", and an occasional "angry edge", but called the book "courageous" and felt that Bawer, whose stated aim was to approach his topic "with reason, not rancor", had fulfilled that aim "with precisely the qualities that distinguish his literary criticism". Moreover, Yardley supported Bawer's case for gay marriage, even though "the mere mention of [it] still sends millions of Americans into orbit".

More conservative voices included Margaret O'Brien Steinfels of the Catholic magazine Commonweal, who, in the New York Times Book Review, described the book as "a model polemic" and admired Bawer's "efforts to be fair and balanced". Yet she rejected Bawer's call for same-sex marriage, arguing that insisting on it "is likely to prove... explosive". Gay-rights opponent Maggie Gallagher, while calling the book "fascinating", criticized Bawer for being dissatisfied with "mere tolerance". Helle Bering-Jensen, in the Washington Times, sounded a similar note, arguing that while most Americans "are quite happy to let other folks live the lives they please", many "draw the line... at gays in the military, gay marriages, gay parenting and so forth".

A Place at the Table was nominated for a Lambda Literary Award in the category of Gay Men's Studies and was named a Notable Book of the Year by The New York Times, which described it as a "sharply argued polemic".

In a 1999 article, "A Book that Made a Difference", author and attorney Dale Carpenter noted that in the 1990s, the defining gay political causes were not revolutionary in nature but instead "sought to weave gays into the larger fabric of American life" and that "No author better crystallized this deep and widespread yearning than Bruce Bawer in... A Place at the Table, the decade's most important book on the gay movement." The book, claimed Carpenter, "articulated better than any book before or since gays' rightful place in our culture" and "fueled a self-conscious movement of gay moderates and conservatives that is still redirecting gay politics". Largely as a result of Bawer's book, a "new generation" of gays entered politics and "insisted that gay organizations put issues like marriage at the top of the agenda". To be sure, "A Place at the Table wasn't solely responsible for all of this... But the book brought it together, nurtured it, and sent it on its way. Bawer's world, to a very large extent, is now our world; his methods, our methods; his goals, our goals. He wrote the book of the decade and changed gay politics forever." In a 2019 article commemorating the fiftieth anniversary of the Stonewall riots, James Kirchick stated that gay-rights activists had long been divided into integrationists, who "argued for the incorporation of gay people into all aspects of American society", and separatists, who "believe that American society itself should be upended", and referred to A Place at the Table as "the integrationist founding text".

Gay issues: Other writings and activities

On an episode of the Charlie Rose Show marking the 25th anniversary of the Stonewall Riots, Bawer took part in a discussion with fellow gay moderate Andrew Sullivan and gay-left writers Tony Kushner and Donna Minkowitz. Minkowitz underlined the conflict between the two sides of the gay-rights movement by saying: "We don't want a place at the table! We want to turn the table over!" A New York Public Library lecture by Bawer, also marking the 25th anniversary of Stonewall, appeared in abbreviated form as a cover story in the New Republic.  A Washington Post article about the 25th anniversary of Stonewall quoted Bawer on gay pride marches: "It's hard to make straight people understand how serious an issue gay rights is when they look and see a kind of Mardi Gras atmosphere... It doesn't communicate the idea that these are serious issues." In a letter to The New York Times, Bawer criticized an editorial that ran on the morning of the Stonewall 25 gay-pride march. The editors chided "gay moderates and conservatives" for seeking "to assure the country that the vast majority of gay people are 'regular' people just like the folks next door". Bawer retorted, in part: "Well, most gays do live next door to straight people... we're not putting down cross-dressers or leathermen or anyone else; we're simply refuting an extremely misleading stereotype." After the publication of A Place at the Table, Bawer wrote widely about gay life, culture, and politics. From 1994 to 1999, he was a regular columnist for The Advocate, the gay newsmagazine. His Advocate columns and other articles by Bawer on gay issues were later collected in an e-book, The Marrying Kind.

In 1994, reviewing Robb Forman Dew's book The Family Heart: A Memoir of When Our Son Came Out, Bawer praised the book but added: "To be gay is to yearn for a time when it won't be necessary for mothers to write sensitive books about their children's coming out." Reviewing a book by Urvashi Vaid in 1995, Bawer argued that "while more and more gay people" were seeking a gay-rights movement focused on "integration, education and conciliation", Vaid wished "to return to the day of class struggle and liberation fronts". The fact that "her rhetoric has come to seem so old so fast", he concluded, "is a measure of how gay political discourse outside the academy, anyway—has been profoundly altered in a relatively brief time". Bawer explicitly called for same-sex marriage in a March 1996 New York Times op-ed. In June 1997, he expressed concern that so-called "morning-after" treatments for possible HIV infection could result in "increased carelessness" by at-risk individuals. In January 2001, he urged the Bush administration in a New York Times op-ed "to take substantive action on behalf of gays", arguing that the U.S. government was "now lagging behind the American people on gay issues".

Bawer commented frequently on the treatment of gays in the films and TV. In a March 10, 1996, Times article, Bawer argued that while new films from Britain, the Netherlands, France, and Germany provided fresh, human treatments of gay people, most Hollywood movies about gays continued to be timid, banal, and formulaic.  On April 14, 1996, Bawer said on the CBS Evening News, apropos of the new movie The Birdcage, that "A good farce has one foot in reality. A gay person going to see this movie realizes this movie doesn't have a single foot in reality." Martin Walker in The Guardian cited Bawer's complaint about the makers of The Birdcage: "They don't get gay life. They don't get anything, outside of a narrow Hollywood idea of gay life. These characters have no dignity, nor pride." Bawer was a major subject of Angela D. Dillard's 2001 book Guess Who's Coming to Dinner Now? Multicultural Conservatism in America. Reviewing it for Salon, he described it as a book written from "the heart of Academic Country, where the very existence of conservatives who are not straight white males can indeed generate horror and confusion (or, alternatively, amusement, perhaps bordering on clinical hysteria), and where, as surely as a multiplicity of genders, skin colors, ethnic backgrounds and sexual orientations is the collective dream, a multiplicity of viewpoints is the collective nightmare". He described Dillard's account of "gay conservative" as ill-informed and criticized her for, among other things, including him on "a list of people who have 'sided with the Religious Right'—even though I wrote Stealing Jesus (1997), which indicts fundamentalism as a betrayal of Christianity".

In a 1995 Washington Post article, Jim Marks cited Bawer's observation that (in Marks's paraphrase) "[I]t gets harder to claim that gay men and lesbians are outside mainstream culture, when so much of mainstream culture—the Mona Lisa and Moby-Dick, to use Bawer's examples—is seen as the product of gay and lesbian minds." In a 1996 piece on gay marriage, New York Times columnist Frank Rich cited Bawer's view that there existed "a gentlemen's agreement" among Washington conservatives. He quoted Bawer as saying: "They say 'We'll socialize with you and your significant other and we'll all be charming, as long as you don't mention it in public, and we get to say anything we want in public.'" A 1997 Washington Post article about an upcoming episode of Ellen DeGeneres's sitcom, Ellen, on which her character would come out of the closet, mimicking DeGeneres's own recent coming out, ended with a quote from Bawer. "People used to do courageous things without having a publicist around to tell the world."

Bawer's prominence in the gay-rights commentariat drew the ire of some leftists. Peter Kurth complained at Salon on November 30, 1998, that "Bruce Bawer, Gabriel Rotello, Michelangelo Signorile, and the inevitable Larry Kramer have, with [Andrew] Sullivan and a few others, secured a virtual lock on gay commentary in the American media." Paul Robinson's book Queer Wars: The New Gay Right and Its Critics, published by the University of Chicago in 2005, devoted the first of its three chapters to an analysis and critique of Bawer's writings on gay issues.

Beyond Queer

The Free Press published the anthology Beyond Queer: Challenging Gay Left Orthodoxy in 1996. Edited by Bawer, it included essays by John W. Berresford, David Boaz, Stephen H. Chapman, Mel Dahl, David Link, Carolyn Lochhead, Daniel Mendelsohn, Stephen H. Miller, Jonathan Rauch, Andrew Sullivan, Paul Varnell, Norah Vincent, and John Weir, as well as Bawer. Booklist called it one of the "outstanding anthologies" of 1996", saying that it "marks the end of radical dominance in gay politics and culture" and "the beginning of a pragmatic and democratic approach to gay issues". Ron Hayes, writing in The Palm Beach Post, called it "complex, unsettling and thought provoking" and maintained that "No straight person who reads these essays will ever assume all gays are liberal again. And no gay person will ever assume that all conservatives are his enemy, either."

To read the essays in Beyond Queer, wrote Joseph Bottum in the Weekly Standard, "is to experience, again and again, this sense of language broken loose, words unmoored from meaning". Bottum argued that the book's contributors fail "to understand the internal logic of the forms of life to which they demand admittance"; they "want... the tradition without the discipline, the gravity of dogmatic religion and conventional marriage without the duties and surrenders that create gravity. They want, in other words, a reformation of language to purchase for them the fruits that require a reformation of life." Bottum later reversed his views entirely, writing an article, "The Things We Share: A Catholic's Case for Same-Sex Marriage", in which he admitted that "there's been damage done in the course of this whole debate, some of it by me".

Beyond Queer was nominated for a Lambda Literary Award in the category of Nonfiction Anthology.
Looking back on the book in 2007, James Kirchick of the New Republic said that it had been "perhaps the most important work of gay nonfiction since Randy Shilts' And the Band Played On".

House & Home

In 1996, Dutton published House and Home, the memoir of Steve Gunderson, a gay Republican Congressman from Wisconsin, and Gunderson's partner, Rob Morris. Gunderson and Morris wrote the book with Bawer. A reviewer in The Hill called the book "powerful".

Christianity

Stealing Jesus

In his book Stealing Jesus: How Fundamentalism Betrays Christianity (1997), Bawer stated, in the words of Publishers Weekly, "that fundamentalist Christianity... has been preaching a message of wrath and judgment" that "is incompatible with Jesus' message of love". While criticizing "Bawer's sometimes strident tone", Publishers Weekly said that his "graceful prose and lucid insights make this a must-read book for anyone concerned with the relationship of Christianity to contemporary American culture". Walter Kendrick, in The New York Times, noted that like A Place at the Table, Stealing Jesus was an "alarm bell", in this case about Christian fundamentalism. Although Kendrick complained that, Bawer's hopes to the contrary, there was "no hope of converting the fundamentalists", he concluded that the book might "prove of value simply for its clear exposition of what today's American 'fundamentalists' believe and want to do".

The response of fundamentalist Protestants and traditional Catholics to the book was more critical. "The thesis of Stealing Jesus is an antinomian heresy rooted in gnostic dualism about the flesh and spirit", pronounced Catholic priest George W. Rutler in National Review, suggesting that "Bawer could some day write something about the real Church, if he read St. Francis de Sales's Treatise on the Love of God, spent a few days in Lourdes, and quieted down with a good cigar."

Stealing Jesus was nominated for a Lambda Literary Award in the category of Spirituality/Religion.

Christianity: Other writings and activities

Bawer has written widely on religious topics. In an April 1996 article for the New York Times Magazine, he reported on the heresy trial in the Episcopal Church over the ordination of gay clergy. In a 1997 New York Times op-ed, he discussed what he saw as "the growing divide between North and South in American Protestantism and the declining significance of denominational distinctions". In a 1998 article about Robert Duvall's film The Apostle, Bawer expressed surprise "that a movie with such a dark, realistic texture... should candy-coat the religious subculture in which it is set". In a 1998 review of New York Episcopal Bishop Paul Moores autobiography, Bawer described him as "a more complex figure than the privileged lefty portrayed by his critics".

Europe

Bawer moved from the U.S. to Europe in 1998, in part, as he later explained, because his long-term exposure to Christian fundamentalism via Stealing Jesus had drawn him to the purportedly more liberal life in Western Europe. In a 2004 New York Times article about American attitudes toward Europe, Richard Bernstein quoted a recent Hudson Review essay in which Bawer said, in Bernstein's paraphrase, "that for a time he thought about writing a book lamenting American anti-intellectualism, indifference to foreign languages and academic achievement, and susceptibility to trash TV", but in the end "didn't write that book... because he discovered that Europe wasn't so comparatively fantastic after all".

After moving to Europe, Bawer contributed a number of travel articles to The New York Times about destinations in Norway and the Netherlands. He has also written scores of articles about the rise of Islam on the continent, the earliest being "Tolerating Intolerance", which appeared in 2002 in Partisan Review.

While Europe Slept

Bawer's book While Europe Slept: How Radical Islam is Destroying the West from Within (2006) concerns his belief in the threat that the rise of Islam in Europe poses to liberal values. Once established in Western European nations, Bawer maintains, Muslims avoid integration and answer only to sharia law, while avoiding the legal systems of their host nations, allowing abuse of women and gays, as well as Jews and other non-Muslims. In his conclusion, Bawer states that rising birthrates among Muslims and their "refusal" to integrate will allow them to dominate European society within 30 years, and that the only way to avoid such a disaster is to abolish the politically correct and multicultural doctrines that, according to him, are rife within the continent.

James Kirchick of The New Republic wrote that the book confirmed Bawer's "intellectual consistency; witnessing American religious fundamentalism, he moved to more socially liberal Europe only to find that Europeans' vaunted cultural tolerance was overlooking a strain of Islamist religious fundamentalism that puts Jerry Falwell to shame".

While Europe Slept was nominated for the National Book Critics Circle Award for 2006 in the criticism category, which led to controversy. Eliot Weinberger, one of the board members of the Circle, stated when he presented the list of nominations that Bawer's book was an example of "racism as criticism". The President of the Circle, John Freeman, declared: "I have never been more embarrassed by a choice than I have been with Bruce Bawer's While Europe Slept", and claimed that "[I]ts hyperventilated rhetoric tips from actual critique into Islamophobia." J. Peder Zane, a member on the nomination committee, said that Weinberger "was completely unfair to Bruce Bawer" and insulting to the committee.

While Europe Slept was translated into Spanish, Danish, Dutch, and Portuguese, and was a New York Times bestseller. Bawer discussed the book in a half-hour interview on Bill Moyers Journal. He has also talked about Islam on such programs as The Michael Coren Show in Canada and at various conferences in the U.S., Canada, and Europe.

Surrender

In Surrender: Appeasing Islam, Sacrificing Freedom (2009), Bawer argued "that people throughout the Western world—in reaction to such events as the Danish cartoon riots and the murder of filmmaker Theo van Gogh—are surrendering to fear" and thus censoring themselves and others and "refus[ing] to criticize even the most illiberal aspects of Islamic culture", thereby "undermin[ing] the values of individual liberty and equality on which our nation was founded". Ray Olson of Booklist called the book "Sublimely literate" and "urgent". Martin Sieff in the Washington Times found it "alarming, depressing, brilliant and remarkably courageous". In The New York Times Book Review, Stephen Pollard said that the book was, "at times, hard going", partly "because of the level of detail Bawer offers in support of his argument" and partly because "Bawer is unquestionably correct, and that fact is quite simply terrifying." Like While Europe Slept, the book is considered part of the "Eurabia genre".

The Victims' Revolution

Bawer's book The Victims' Revolution (2012) concerned the rise of identity studies in American universities. Identity studies, according to Bawer, reduce the human experience to ideologically charged jargon about power relationships among groups. Publishers Weekly said that while Bawer's "critique seldom engages seriously with the intellectual content of the field", his book was "a lively, cantankerous takedown of a juicy target" that scored "lots of entertaining points against the insufferable posturing and unreadable prose that pervades identity studies". Sohbab Ahmari, in The Wall Street Journal, praised the book for its exposure of relativism on campus, while Andrew Delbanco, in The New York Times Book Review, found Bawer's complaints outdated, arguing that universities, in Delbanco's view, are returning to traditional subjects. National Reviews Jay Nordlinger, on the other hand, praised the book's "wonderfulness" and wrote: "I wish people would read The Victims' Revolution. I especially wish it of students and others in academia."

Islam: Other writings and activities

After moving to Europe, Bawer worked for a time as a columnist and translator for the website of Human Rights Service, an Oslo-based think tank focused on immigration and integration issues. He has also written for FrontPage Magazine websites, for City Journal, for the Gatestone Institute website, and on his blog. The New Quislings: How the International Left Used the Oslo Massacre to Silence Debate about Islam (2012) is an e-book by Bawer about the aftermath of the mass murders committed by Anders Behring Breivik on July 22, 2011. Bawer has been regarded as being part of the counter-jihad movement.

Later books
In 2017, Bawer published The Alhambra: A Novel of Islam in Europe. In 2019 Bawer published a short book called A Marriage Made at the Copa, about his parents, and two collections of essays entitled Islam and So Far.

Translated text

Since living in Europe, Bawer has translated all or part of several books from Norwegian to English, including the following:
 Jørn Holme, The Security Council Chamber (Press, 2018)
 Renate Nedregård, Vestre (Press, 2017) 
 Geir Thomas Risåsen, Eidsvollsbygningen (Press, 2016)
 National Tourist Routes in Norway (Press, 2015) 
 Jan Freuchen, Columna Transatlantica (Press, 2015)
 Daniela Büchten, ed., Propaganda (Press, 2014)
 Pål Brekke and Fredrik Broms, Northern Lights (Press, 2013) 
 , Barents Portraits (Press, 2013)
 Magne Furuholmen, In Transit (Press, 2013)
 , Racing (Press, 2012)
 , a-ha: photographs 1994–2010 (Press, 2012) 
 Various authors, Peter Fischli, David Weiss: Rock on Top of Another Rock (Press, 2012)
 Various authors: Mark Dion: Den (Press, 2012)
 Henrik H. Langeland, OSL2011 (Press, 2011)
 Sigbjørn Sigbjørnson, Taxi: A Photographic Journey (Press, 2010)
 , a-ha: The Swing of Things 1985–2010 (2004 edition translated by Donald Tumasonis; translation revised and new material translated by Bawer) (Press, 2010)
 , ed., Neighbourhood Secrets (Press, 2009)
 Berit Arnestad Foote, Point Hope, Alaska (Press, 2009)
 Various authors, Capital of Culture: Stavanger 2008 (Press, 2007)
 Bjørn Li, introduction to Odd Nerdrum, Themes (Press, 2007)
 , Paintings (Press, 2006)
 , Eyewitness (Press, 2006)
 Kjersti Alveberg, Visions (Press, 2005)
 Hege Storhaug, Human Visas (Kolofon, 2003)
 Vetle Karlsen Eide, Covenant and Grace: A Study of the Diaconate of the United Methodist Church in Light of John Wesley's Theology (translated with ) (master's thesis, The Theological Faculty, University of Oslo, 2000)

Honors and awards
 The Middle Generation was selected as an Outstanding Academic Book of the Year by the American Library Association.
 Coast to Coast was selected as the best first book of poetry of the 1993 by the Dictionary of Literary Biography Yearbook.
 A Place at the Table, Beyond Queer, and Stealing Jesus were nominated for Lambda Literary Awards.
 While Europe Slept was a finalist for the National Book Critics Circle Award.

In December 2004, New York Times columnist David Brooks gave one of his annual "Hookie Awards" (in memory of Sidney Hook; now known as "Sidney Awards") for best magazine articles of the year to Bawer's Wilson Quarterly essay "The Other Sixties".

Bibliography
 The Middle Generation: The Lives and Poetry of Delmore Schwartz, Randall Jarrell, John Berryman, and Robert Lowell, Archon Books, 1986, 
 The Contemporary Stylist, Harcourt Brace Jovanovich, 1987, 
 Diminishing Fictions: Essays on the Modern American Novel and its Critics, Graywolf Press, 1988, 
 The Screenplay's the Thing: Movie Criticism, 1986–1990, Archon Books, 1992, 
 
 Prophets and Professors: Essays On the Lives and Work of Modern Poets, Story Line Press, 1995, 
 Beyond Queer: Challenging Gay Left Orthodoxy, Free Press, 1996, 
 
 While Europe Slept: How Radical Islam is Destroying the West from Within, Random House, 2006, 
 
 The New Quislings: How the International Left Used the Oslo Massacre to Silence Debate About Islam, Harper Collins, 2012, .
 The Victims' Revolution: The Rise of Identity Studies and the Closing of the Liberal Mind, Harper Collins, 2012, 
 The Alhambra, Swamp Fox Press, 2017

Poetry
 Innocence: Eight Poems, Aralia Press, 1988
 Coast to Coast: Poems, Story Line Press, 1993,

See also

 Criticism of Islam
 Criticism of multiculturalism

References

External links
 Bruce Bawer Homepage
 Bruce Bawer, "While Europe Sneered", City Journal online (January 5, 2010)
 Bruce Bawer, "An Anatomy of Surrender", City Journal (Spring 2008)
 Bruce Bawer, "The Peace Racket", City Journal (Summer 2007)
 
 Bruce Bawer, review of Hating America in Hudson Review, vol. 57, no. 1 (Spring 2004)
 Bruce Bawer, "9/11, Five Years Later: A View from Europe", Die Volkskrant (September 2, 2006)
 Patricia Cohen, "In Books, a Clash of Europe and Islam", The New York Times (February 8, 2007)
 Tim Rutten, review of Surrender by Bruce Bawer, Los Angeles Times (May 20, 2009)
 Andrew Sullivan, "Bawer vs. Bawer", The Daily Beast (July 25, 2011) 

1956 births
Living people
American essayists
American expatriates in Norway
American expatriates in the Netherlands
American humanists
American literary critics
American people of English descent
American people of French descent
American people of Polish descent
American people of Scotch-Irish descent
American people of Scottish descent
American people of Welsh descent
American political writers
American translators
Male critics of feminism
Counter-jihad activists
American critics of Islam
Critics of multiculturalism
Formalist poets
American gay writers
LGBT people from New York (state)
American LGBT poets
New York (state) Democrats
Norwegian–English translators
Norwegian critics of Islam
Poets from New York (state)
Stony Brook University faculty
Stony Brook University alumni
Writers from New York City
American male essayists
American male poets
American poets
Writers about religion and science
Gay poets